Give Us a Clue is a British televised game show version of charades which was broadcast on ITV from 1979 to 1992. The original host was Michael Aspel from 1979 to 1984, followed by Michael Parkinson from 1984 to 1992. The show featured two teams, one captained by Lionel Blair and the other by Una Stubbs. Later versions of the programme had Liza Goddard as captain of the women's team. Norman Vaughan stood in for Blair for four episodes in the second series and Joyce Blair stood in for Stubbs for the 1981 Royal Wedding special. Originally, each team consisted of the captain, two celebrities and one non-celebrity. The non-celebrity participation was dropped and another celebrity was added in their place. On one infamous edition of the programme, the male non-celebrity was handed the title he had to mime on a card by host Michael Aspel, but, rather than read the title, he read the wrong side of the card, on which his name was printed. He thus mimed his name to his teammates. Lionel Blair later wrote this incident led to the dropping of non-celebrity participants.

A revived version was broadcast by BBC One in 1997 over 30 episodes, hosted by Tim Clark. Teams were captained by Christopher Blake and Julie Peasgood and the show introduced a lateral thinking puzzle (which the host could "give clues to"). Give Us a Clue returned for a special Comic Relief episode in March 2011 with Sara Cox, Christopher Biggins, Lionel Blair, Una Stubbs, Holly Walsh, Jenni Falconer and David Walliams.

Format
The game was based on charades, a party game where players used mime rather than speaking to demonstrate a name, phrase, book, play, film or TV programme. Each player was given roughly two minutes to act out their given subject in front of his/her team, and if the others were unsuccessful in guessing correctly, the opposing team would have a chance to answer for a bonus point.

Celebrity panelists

Series 1 (1979)

Series 2 (1979-80)

Series 3 (1980-81)

Specials (1981)

Series 4 (1981-82)

Series 5 (1982)

Series 6 (1983-84)

Transmissions

DVD release
The first six series of Give Us a Clue have been released on DVD by Network, but only 98 out of the first 106 episodes were included. The eight episodes that are not in the collection had appearances of three celebrities with sexual abuse offences that were investigated in Operation Yewtree.

References

External links
.
Give Us a Clue (1979–1992) at BFI.
Give Us a Clue (1997) at BFI.

1979 British television series debuts
1997 British television series endings
1970s British game shows
1980s British game shows
1990s British game shows
BBC television game shows
British panel games
English-language television shows
ITV game shows
Television series by Fremantle (company)
Television series by Reg Grundy Productions
British television series revived after cancellation
Television shows produced by Thames Television
Television shows shot at Teddington Studios